Gunte is a small settlement in the hills above the right bank of the Sava River in the Municipality of Krško in eastern Slovenia. The area is part of the traditional region of Lower Carniola. It is now included with the rest of the municipality in the Lower Sava Statistical Region.

Archaeological finds from the area indicate that the Roman road from Neviodunum to Celeia and the bridge over the Sava River were on the banks below the settlement.

References

External links
Gunte on Geopedia

Populated places in the Municipality of Krško